Rostrinucula is a genus of flowering plants in the family Lamiaceae, first described as a genus in 1929. It has two known species, both endemic to China.

Species
 Rostrinucula dependens (Rehder) Kudô - Guizhou, Shaanxi, Sichuan, Yunnan
 Rostrinucula sinensis (Hemsl.) C.Y.Wu - Guangxi, Guizhou, Hubei, Hunan

References

Lamiaceae
Endemic flora of China
Lamiaceae genera